Varaz Vzur was an Armenian nobleman who served as the marzban of Persian Armenia from 579 to 580. In 579, he succeeded Tamkhosrau as the marzban of Armenia. Some time later, a group of Armenians revolted against Sasanian rule. Varaz Vzur fought the rebels at Uthmus. Although he was first repulsed by the Armenian rebels, he eventually managed to emerge victorious. One year later, he was succeeded by Pahlav.

Sources

  Les dynasties de la Caucasie chrétienne de l’Antiquité jusqu’au XIXe siècle ; Tables généalogiques et chronologiques, Rome, 1990.

 

Year of death unknown
Sasanian governors of Armenia
Year of birth unknown
6th-century Iranian people
6th-century Armenian people
Generals of Khosrow I
Armenian people from the Sasanian Empire